Save Me from Myself is the debut studio album by American rock musician Brian "Head" Welch. After failing to meet a July 2007 release, the album was released on September 9, 2008 by Driven Music Group. Tentatively, the album's working title was It's Time to See Religion Die, however, it was confirmed that its final title is Save Me from Myself.

Background and production
In February 2005, Welch left Korn which he helped form in 1993, saying moral reasons caused his departure. Welch stated he had distanced himself from the band for one or two years, "I just wanted to fade away, it was crazy. I was so gone." Welch wished to rededicate his life to Jesus. Shortly after, Welch asked Korn's bassist, Reginald Arvizu, to produce the album, however, he received no response. While looking for a home in Arizona, Welch entered the recording studio. He immediately began writing; "entire songs would just come out: drums, bass, guitar, strings, choir, lyrics, everything... It was as if God was just downloading these songs inside me." After months of songwriting, "about three albums worth of material" had been created.

On the experience of working with other musicians again since his departure from Korn, Welch attests, "It's been a long time since I've connected with people musically and, now that the wounds have healed from my past addictions, I'm ready to feel the magic again."

Promotion
On June 5, 2008, Welch posted a video announcement on his website. The video announced that Welch had officially signed with Driven Music Group, and would release Save Me from Myself on September 9, 2008.

A three-minute sample of Head's first single, "Flush", was posted on Welch's website on June 16, 2008. The single was released on July 8, 2008 on the iTunes Store, and a music video directed by Frankie Nasso of Nova Entertainment was filmed in Los Angeles, and released on September 5, 2008. On August 26, 2008, Welch revealed the lengths of each song on the album.

Musical and lyrical themes

Welch wrote in his autobiography, Save Me from Myself, that ideas for lyrics and music often came from conversations with friends, including themes for "Re-Bel" and "Washed by Blood". The music has "a Christian, spiritual edge", while being an "extension of the Korn family". "I literally poured everything I had into Save Me from Myself," Welch explained in June 2008, "I know it's gonna inspire a lot of people."

The song "Flush", Welch explains, was written musically first. Welch had accidentally locked himself in his studio, so he decided, "I'm gonna go back inside, grab my keyboard, and whatever my hands do, I'll make a song out of it." He had created the opening riff for "Flush". Lyrically, Welch cites, "the lyrics for 'Flush' are basically about flushing all the crap in life down the toilet and starting out fresh," Welch continued, "All the drama that I experienced with getting drunk and doing drugs all the time seemed interesting and amusing to write about."

Welch wrote "Re-Bel" after a friend told him about a child she knew with problems, due to poor treatment from his parents. The story reminded Welch of how he used to drink and not take care of his daughter when he should have. The lyrics of the song are about kids who run to God due to negative things in their life so that "He could bring healing into their lives".

Welch said that the title track, "Save Me from Myself", is his most personal song. The verses talk about Welch's drug use, suicidal thoughts, depression, and lying. His favorite part "is when I'm screaming to God, thanking him for saving me from myself... and am living for Him now."

Welch said that "Die Religion Die" has multiple meanings to him. The song "encourages people to get out of the whole 'Sunday Christian' mentality" and helps them understand that God "dwells in us", not "in buildings". He wrote in his autobiography, "All of the man-made religion crap in this world has to die. Whether it's Christian man-made religion crap or some other man-made religion crap, it all has to die." Welch continues to explain, "All that prideful, controlling religious crap is what drives young people away from churches, and it has to go."

"Washed by Blood" was written after a conversation with another friend, who asked him "isn't it cool that we're washed by blood?" over breakfast one morning. Welch wrote that he was referring to the Bible calling Jesus' punishment and bleeding on the cross as being "washed by blood". After their meal, "suddenly, this music came into his head".

Referring to the art theme of the cover of the album, Welch explained, "It represents me being trapped in addictions, and getting set free from it from the angel that is standing behind me."

Reception

Save Me from Myself has been generally well received by critics. Some praised the album's message, "Even though the music of Save Me from Myself isn't quite on par with the super hit material of Korn from the late '90s, it is nevertheless a very good nü-metal album with an amazing story of redemption." Andrea Goforth of Christianity Today stated, "The content is so much more positive that anything released by Korn, that I can look past the absence of hooks to find a great deal of hope." Hit Parader praised the musical aspect, stating, "though his lyrical messages may now be more positive and uplifting than anything found in the Korn hard rock catalogue, the style of music brought forth here is as heavy as anything Mr. Welch has ever presented before." The magazine went on to praise the album's lack of "preachy" messages, "throughout Save Me From Myself Head manages to present his inspirational messages without necessarily preaching his beliefs to the metal masses." About.com writer Chad Bowar stated that, "although many of the songs are slow in tempo they don't lack in intensity." Chad Bowar went on to mention the variety of musical styles on the album, "There is a lot of musical diversity, and you'll hear everything from melodic mainstream rock to traditional metal to very dissonant and unsettling harmonies." It has been proposed that the album has a distinctive sound, very reminiscent to Korn, but different in the matter that its uplifting.

The general praise of Save Me from Myself has not been unanimous, however. Reviewing for Metal Edge, Madeline Phillips felt that, "Sadly, in pursuit of greater spiritual understanding . . . Welch seems to have lost all sense of a relatable musical identity and direction," and that despite some noteworthy riffs and decent melodies, the album is "not just alienating - quite frankly, it's boring."

Save Me from Myself shipped over 7,800 copies in its opening week. It debuted at No. 27 in New Zealand, No. 63 on the Billboard 200, No. 7 on the Independent Albums chart, and No. 3 on the Christian Albums chart.

"Flush" controversy
The content of the music video has reportedly caused select retailers to pull Save Me from Myself from their shelves. This prompted Welch to provide his explanation for what transpires in the video:

Track listing

Charts

Personnel

 Brian Welch – vocals, lead and rhythm guitar, synthesizers, programming, producer
 Archie J. Muise Jr. – rhythm guitar
 Trevor Dunn – bass guitar
 Tony Levin – bass guitar
 Josh Freese – drums
 Jennea Welch – vocals
 Doug Angle – vocals
 Christian McCullen – vocals
 Elijah Jurewics – vocals
 Hailey Cooper – vocals
 Taylor Cooper – vocals

 Greg Shanaberger – production supervisor
 Mark Nawara – production supervisor
 Carlos Castro – engineer
 Randy Emata – editing, synthesizers, programming
 Ralph Patlan – editing, mixing
 Bruno Canale – engineer, guitar technician
 Fernando Romay – engineer, guitar technician
 Rafael Patrón – production coordinator
 Patrick Essman – production assistant
 Clint Keener – production assistant
 Evren Goknar – mastering
 Travis Smith – artwork, layout
 Alonso Murillo – photography, photo editing
 Bob Clearmountain – mixing

Release history

References

2008 albums
Brian Welch albums
Driven Music Group albums
Rykodisc albums
Warner Music Group albums